Dexopollenia luteola is a species of cluster fly in the family Polleniidae.

Distribution
Taiwan.

References

Polleniidae
Insects described in 1927
Diptera of Asia